Designed as the successor to the Canon PowerShot S110 in the S series of cameras, the Canon PowerShot S120 is a high-end 12.1-megapixel compact digital camera with 0.3 -stops wider aperture, 0.7 bits more color depth, improved continuous shooting speeds, resolved Wi-Fi sharing functionality, 60 HD video recording, lower noise at higher ISO, better sensor, and same DIGIC6 as current G series model for greater image quality. It was announced by Canon on August 22, 2013.

Features
 12.1 megapixels
 JPEG (Exif 2.3) support
 Raw image file format; one of few "point and shoot" cameras to have raw formatting. (Note: Raw format is not available in Auto, Low Light, and SCN modes. Raw is available in Program,  (shutter priority),  (aperture priority), Manual, and Custom modes)
 ISO sensitivity 80–12800 (in ⅓-step increments) and auto (up to ISO 1600).
 Full manual control
 Customizable Control Ring to control ISO, shutter speed, aperture, focus, or exposure compensation
 Five photo aspect ratios: 16:9, 3:2, 4:3, 1:1, 4:5
 Video features
 Recording Standard, Color Accent, Color Swap: 1920 × 1080 (60 / 30 frame/s), 1280 × 720 (30 frame/s), 640 × 480 (30)
 Recording Miniature Effect: 1280 × 720 (6 / 3 / 1.5 frame/s), 640 × 480 (6 / 3 / 1.5 frame/s)
 Recording Super Slow Motion: 640 × 480 (120 frame/s), 320 × 240 (240 frame/s)
 Recording Full HD Star Time Lapse Movie: 1920 × 1080 (15 frame/s)
 Continuous shooting in P mode: ~12.1 shot/s, 9.4 shot/s from 6th shot. ~5.5 shot/s with AF and LV.
 Multi-touch capacitive touchscreen
 Wi-Fi for internet connectivity or image archival

Improvements
 DIGIC 6 processor
 increased battery capacity (30 shots)
 nearly double the screen resolution to 640×480 pixels (267 dpi, VGA resolution) - the first for a PowerShot S-series ultra-compact.
 ECO mode turns off the LCD display much sooner to help conserve battery power.

Disadvantage
 S110 is 9% smaller
 S110 is 10% thinner
 S110 is 19 grams lighter

Successor
Canon announced the G9X as a follow-up camera to the Canon S series that is capable to compete with Sony's RX100 series compact camera. The camera was announced on October 13, 2015.

References

External links
Usa.canon.com
Canon-europe.com
Canon-europe.com
Cameralabs.com

S120
Cameras introduced in 2013